Borodachi is a rural locality (a selo) and the administrative center of Borodachyovskoye Rural Settlement, Zhirnovsky District, Volgograd Oblast, Russia. The population was 395 as of 2010. There are 5 streets.

Geography 
Borodachi is located in forest steppe of Volga Upland, 56 km southeast of Zhirnovsk (the district's administrative centre) by road. Nedostupov is the nearest rural locality.

References 

Rural localities in Zhirnovsky District